Princewick is an unincorporated community in Raleigh County, West Virginia, United States.

Princewick was laid out in 1916 when the railroad  (Stone Coal Division of the Virginian Railroad ) was extended to that point. The community's name is an amalgamation of Isaac Prince and Thomas Wickham.

References

Unincorporated communities in West Virginia
Unincorporated communities in Raleigh County, West Virginia
Coal towns in West Virginia